Franz "Franzl" Lang (28 December 1930 – 6 December 2015), known as the Yodel King, was an alpine yodeller from Bavaria, Germany.
Lang's genre is German folk music; he typically sang in the Bavarian dialect of the rural Alpine regions.

Career
Raised in Munich, Lang trained as a toolmaker.  He started playing his trademark accordion at the age of nine.  His greatest hit was his 1968 recording of Karl Ganzer's composition "Das Kufsteiner Lied".  Throughout the 1970s, he was a permanent feature of musical variety shows on West German television, especially on the ZDF program Lustige Musikanten.

Lang sold more than 10 million recordings, and earned 20 gold records and one platinum record within the German recording industry.

On his 70th birthday, he performed for the final time.

Personal life & death
He was married to his wife Johanna since 1954; he had one son (Franz Herbert Lang, 1966–1995) and one daughter (Christl). He died at a Munich nursing home on 6 December 2015 from Multiple organ dysfunction syndrome. On January 11, 2016, he was buried in Munich Waldfriedhof, a forest cemetery, with multiple dedications from his family and friends.

Discography (Albums) 
 1970: Bergweihnacht (LP: Philips 63 883, Aufnahme: 1970)
 1977: Urlaub in den Bergen
 1979: Musik aus den Bergen
 1987: Schön ist’s auf der Welt
 1991: Mir geht’s guat
 1996: Freude am Leben
 Alpen-Echo
 Das original Kufsteiner Lied
 Der Königsjodler
 Die schönsten Volkslieder
 Die schönsten Jodler der Welt
 Echo der Berge
 Freunde der Berge
 Goldene Sonne, goldene Berge
 Himmel, Harsch und Firn mit den Kaiserlich Böhmischen
 Holladaratata
 In Oberkrain
 Jodlerkönig
 Kameraden der Berge
 Komm mit in die Berge
 Lagerfeuer in den Bergen
 Ski Heil
 Stimmung beim Bier
 Stimmung beim Jodlerwirt
 Wir kommen von den Bergen
 Zillertal, du bist mei Freud
 Tirol Heimat der Berge
 10 Jahre Jubiläum beim Jodlerwirt
 Im Wilden Westen
 Grüß Gott in Bayern
 Zünftig pfundig kreuzfidel
 Das Bayernland
 Der weißblaue Hammer

Filmography 
 1956: Salzburger Geschichten
 1961: Drei weiße Birken
 1961: Der Orgelbauer von St. Marien
 1961: Schlagerrevue 1962
 1962: Tanze mit mir in den Morgen
 1962: Drei Liebesbriefe aus Tirol

References

External links

1930 births
2015 deaths
German accordionists
German male guitarists
Musicians from Munich
Yodelers
20th-century German male singers
20th-century German male writers
Deaths from multiple organ failure
Burials at Munich Waldfriedhof